William Edward Jones (11 December 1897 – 11 June 1974) was an eminent Welsh Anglican priest in the 20th century. 

He was born in 1897, educated at  Jesus College, Oxford, and ordained in 1922. His first post was as a Minor Canon at Brecon Cathedral after which he Priest in Charge at Kondinin, Western Australia. Later he held Incumbencies at St Luke's, Cottesloe and then St Mary's; West Perth. He was Dean of Brecon Cathedral from 1950 to 1964 then Vicar of Penally until retirement in 1969.

He died in 1974 in Pembrokeshire. His widow, Rachel Jones, was appointed BBC Governor for Wales, a post which caused controversy as she was a non–Welsh speaker.

References

Church in Wales
Alumni of Jesus College, Oxford
Deans of Brecon Cathedral
1897 births

1974 deaths